WP7 may mean:

 Windows Phone 7, Microsoft's operating system for mobile phones
 Version 7 of WordPerfect word processing software, and the file extension used for its files